"Hasta luego" (see you soon) is a Spanish parting phrase which may refer to:

Music
Hasta luego, a compilation album by Los Rodríguez 1996

Songs
"Hasta luego", song written by J. Hicks sung by David Houston (singer) 1956 and Hank Locklin	1967
"Hasta luego", song by Donn Reynolds 1957
"Hasta luego", song by Hugues Aufray 1974
"Hasta luego", song by La Tordue 1995
"Hasta Luego", song by McBride & the Ride from Amarillo Sky (album) (previously recorded by David Ball under the title "Hasta Luego, My Love" on his 1999 album Play)
"Hasta luego", song by Santa Esmeralda 2006
"Hasta luego", song by Maître Gims 2015
"Hasta Luego", song by Zouhair Bahaoui hit single in Morocco  2017
"Hasta Luego", song by J.I.D 2017
"Hasta Luego", song by Tahiti (band) 2018
"Hasta Luego", song by English pop singer HRVY, featuring Cuban-American singer Malu Trevejo 2018

Other
Hasta luego, 1950 book by K-Hito (Ricardo García López) Spanish humorist